Dovbysh is an urban-type settlement in Zviahel Raion, Zhytomyr Oblast, Ukraine. The settlement was also known as Marchlewsk after the Polish-born Soviet politician and civil activist Julian Marchlewski. Population:

History
In the 1920s Marchlewsk was an administrative center of the Polish National Raion of Zhytomyr Okruha (district). Later it was incorporated into Kyiv Oblast.

During World War II, Jews of the town were murdered in a mass execution perpetrated by an Einsatzgruppe.

See also
 Polish Autonomous District

References

Urban-type settlements in Zviahel Raion
Jewish Ukrainian history
Holocaust locations in Ukraine